The 2015–16 Arizona State Sun Devils men's basketball team represented Arizona State University during the 2015–16 NCAA Division I men's basketball season. The Sun Devils were led by first year head coach Bobby Hurley and played their home games at Wells Fargo Arena in Tempe, Arizona. They were members of Pac–12 Conference. They finished the season 15–17, 5–13 in Pac-12 play to finish in 11th place. They lost in the first round of the Pac-12 tournament to Oregon State.

Previous season
The Sun Devils finished the 2014–15 season with a record of 18–16, and 9–9 in the Pac-12 play. In the Pac-12 tournament, the Sun Devils lost to USC in the first round. They received an at-large bid to the NIT, where they defeated UConn in the first round before losing in the second round to Richmond.

Off-season

Departures

Incoming transfers

2015 recruiting class

Roster

Sept. 9, 2015 – Freshman forward, Andre Adams to miss entire season due to a torn ACL in his left knee.
Feb. 23, 2016 – Junior Andre Spight left team with four games left in the season and intends to transfer.

Schedule

|-
!colspan=12 style="background:#; color:#;"| Exhibition

|-
!colspan=12 style="background:#; color:#;"| Non-conference regular season

|-
!colspan=12 style="background:#;"| Pac-12 Regular Season

|-
!colspan=12 style="background:#;"| Pac-12 tournament

See also
2015–16 Arizona State Sun Devils women's basketball team

References

Arizona State Sun Devils men's basketball seasons
Arizona State
Arizona State Sun Devils men's basketball
Arizona State Sun Devils men's basketball